The 1996 Louisiana United States Senate election was held on November 5, 1996, to select a new U.S. Senator from the state of Louisiana to replace retiring John Bennett Johnston, Jr. of Shreveport. After the jungle primary election, state treasurer Mary Landrieu went into a runoff election with State Representative Woody Jenkins of Baton Rouge, a former Democrat who had turned Republican two years earlier.

Landrieu prevailed by 5,788 votes out of 1.7 million cast, or a margin of 0.34%, thus making this election the closest race of the 1996 Senate election cycle and one of the closest elections in Louisiana history and she was the first woman elected female U.S. Senator in the state's history. In the concurrent presidential election, Democrat Bill Clinton carried Louisiana by a considerable margin of 927,837 votes to 712,586 cast for Republican Bob Dole.

Jungle primary elections
The multi-candidate field for the primary included Democratic state Attorney General Richard Ieyoub and David Duke, the former Grand Wizard of the Ku Klux Klan, running again as a Republican. Among the minor candidates was Peggy Wilson, an at-large member of the New Orleans City Council, and Troyce Guice, who had sought the same seat thirty years earlier when it was held by the veteran Senator Allen J. Ellender.

Runoff election results
Certified Results After Recount

|-
| 
| colspan=5 |Democratic hold
|-

Allegations of election fraud
Landrieu carried the Democratic stronghold of New Orleans by about 100,000 votes; in the days after the runoff election, Jenkins's campaign manager Tony Perkins alleged voting irregularities there.

Jenkins refused to concede and claimed to have received many complaints about election fraud in New Orleans for incidents such as vote hauling and participation by unregistered voters. In April 1997, Jenkins appeared before the Republican-controlled U.S. Senate and petitioned for Landrieu's unseating pending a new election. In a party-line 8–7 vote, the Senate Rules Committee agreed to investigate the charges.

Only a month into the probe, however, it emerged that Thomas "Papa Bear" Miller, a detective hired by Jenkins to investigate claims of fraud, had coached witnesses to claim they had participated in election fraud.  Three witnesses claimed Miller had paid them to claim that they had either cast multiple votes for Landrieu or drove vans of illegal voters across town.  The others told such bizarre tales that FBI agents dismissed their claims out of hand.  It also emerged that Miller had several felony convictions on his record, including a guilty plea to attempted murder.  The Democrats walked out of the probe in protest, but the probe continued.

The investigation dragged on for over ten months, angering the Democrats and exacerbating partisan friction in the day-to-day sessions of the Senate Agriculture, Nutrition and Forestry Committee to which Landrieu was assigned as a freshman member of the 105th Congress. Finally, in October 1997, the Rules Committee concluded that while there were major electoral irregularities, none of them were serious enough to burden Louisiana with a new election at that stage.  It recommended that the results stand.

The Landrieu-Jenkins contest was not the only U.S. Senate election in 20th century Louisiana in which the results were hotly disputed. In 1918, future Senator John H. Overton claimed the renomination and hence reelection of Senator Joseph E. Ransdell was tainted by fraud. In 1932, Senator Edwin S. Broussard claimed that his primary defeat by Overton was fraudulent. In both cases, the Senate seated the certified winners, Ransdell and Overton, respectively.

See also 
 1996 United States Senate elections

Notes

References

External links
 November 5, 1996 runoff results from Louisiana Secretary of State
 Archive of stories from November 9, 1996, to June 28, 1997, about election dispute from The Advocate of Baton Rouge

1996 Louisiana elections
Louisiana
1996